The 1865 Louisiana gubernatorial election was the second election to take place under the Louisiana Constitution of 1864. As a result of this election James Madison Wells was re-elected Governor of Louisiana. The result was a lopsided victory for Wells because many whites, who supported the Democratic Party, remained disqualified due to their support of the Confederacy. Nonetheless Democrats nominated fugitive former Governor Henry Watkins Allen.

Results
Popular Vote

References

1865
Gubernatorial
Louisiana
November 1865 events